Stare Osieczno is a village in the administrative district of Gmina Dobiegniew, within Strzelce-Drezdenko County, Lubusz Voivodeship, in western Poland. 

As of 2011, it had a population of 120.

Notable residents
 Friedrich Wilhelm Semmler (1836–1931), German chemist

References

Stare Osieczno